"Drivin' Around Song" is a song recorded by American country rap singer Colt Ford and country music singer Jason Aldean. It is the third single from his fourth studio album, Declaration of Independence. The song was written by Chris Tompkins and Craig Wiseman.

Critical reception
Billy Dukes of Taste of Country gave the song three stars out of five, saying that "It’s the sort of chorus you’d find on, well … a Jason Aldean song. His voice blends seamlessly into the arrangement, which can’t be said about Ford’s lines. He patters over a thin banjo and drum machine until the build to the chorus. This leaves his gruff delivery to carry the story without the support of the energetic sound machine that makes him such a popular live act. That’s not the best use of his talent."

Music video
The music video was directed by Potsy Ponciroli and premiered in October 2013.
The video features footage of an ATV driving around Mooresville, North Carolina.

Chart performance
"Drivin' Around Song" debuted at number 6 on the U.S. Billboard Bubbling Under Hot 100 chart.

Certifications

References

2013 singles
Colt Ford songs
Jason Aldean songs
Songs written by Chris Tompkins
Songs written by Craig Wiseman
Average Joes Entertainment singles
Song recordings produced by Dann Huff
2012 songs
Male vocal duets